Flying Colours was a UK charter airline that operated for 4 years between 1996 and 2000.

History

The airline began operations in the summer of 1997 with a fleet of six Airbus A320, two Airbus A321 and eleven Boeing 757-200 aircraft.

Flying Colours had several operational bases outside of its Manchester Airport headquarters, including London Gatwick Airport and Glasgow International Airport. The airline quickly established a positive reputation in the charter industry, with a fleet of newly built aircraft and new features; Flying Colours were the first airline in the UK to have LCD TV screens in the cabins of their 757s.

In 1998, then the travel agent Thomas Cook & Son acquired Flying Colours Leisure Group.

Subsequently, the in-house charter airline of Thomas Cook, Airworld, adopted the Flying Colours Airlines brand.  Shortly after the takeover two ex-Airworld Airbus A321s were returned to their lessor. The airline also maintained the Airworld operating base at Bristol.

In 1999 Thomas Cook completed the acquisition of Carlson Leisure Group, who operated the charter carriers Caledonian Airways and Peach Air.    This led to a complete rebrand by Thomas Cook of its growing tour operation.  In 2000, Thomas Cook rebranded their charter airline operations as JMC Air, part of a new universal customer-facing brand, "JMC".

Flying Colours ordered two Airbus A330-200 aircraft to begin longhaul operations, these aircraft arrived after the JMC rebrand.

JMC Air was rebranded as Thomas Cook Airlines in 2002. Thomas Cook Airlines UK then later announced a merger with fellow Manchester-founded airline MyTravel Airways; the parent companies were scheduled to merge in June 2007 with the two airlines merging in November 2007. Thomas Cook Airlines ceased operations in September 2019, following the collapse of the parent travel agent company.

See also
 List of defunct airlines of the United Kingdom

References

External links

1996 establishments in England
2000 disestablishments in England
Airlines established in 1996
Airlines disestablished in 2000
Defunct charter airlines of the United Kingdom
Defunct companies based in Manchester
Transport in Manchester
British companies established in 1996
British companies disestablished in 2000